Jetstream (Haroun ibn Sallah al-Rashid) is a fictional Moroccan mutant character appearing in American comic books published by Marvel Comics. Created as a part of the group known as the Hellions, he exists in Marvel's main shared universe, known as the Marvel Universe. His first appearance was in The New Mutants #16.

Fictional character biography
Haroun ibn Sallah al-Rashid was born in the Rif Mountains in Morocco. As Jetstream, he was a student and operative of the White Queen and member of the original group of Hellions, the trainee group of mutants set up by the Hellfire Club to be a rival to the New Mutants. Haroun felt obligated to be part of the group; they gave him cybernetics to stop his powers from causing self-injury. Jetstream was the antithesis of Cannonball, who could also propel himself through the air and was also the team leader. He engaged in several battles with the New Mutants—mostly petty competition—but occasionally got along with the students, sometimes having dances for socialization.

On the first mission of the Hellions, Jetstream helped to capture Doug Ramsey and Kitty Pryde from the X-Mansion. When the New Mutants came to reclaim their own, Jetstream was defeated by Magma, and quarreled with fellow Hellion Empath. The two teams decided to solve the dispute their own way: a duel between Cannonball and Jetstream with the winner getting to keep the captives. Jetstream lost, but Emma Frost returned in time with Sebastian Shaw to deter the New Mutants from retrieving their friends. Kitty was able to create a diversion for Magik to be able to transport the team to safety.
 
Later, when the New Mutants were in a state of emotional turmoil over being killed and resurrected by the Beyonder, Emma Frost saw it as her opportunity to sweep in and take control. She convinced Magneto—the current leader of the team—to allow the New Mutants to come to the Massachusetts Academy for psychic counseling, where she promptly accepted them into the ranks of her Hellions. The two teams became quite fond of one another, and Jetstream was able to challenge Cannonball to another duel, but the teams were separated when Magneto realized that his emotions had been manipulated by Empath to convince him to relinquish the students.

Jetstream later used his skill with computers to find Empath, who had been captured by the New Mutants. Jetstream later repeated his challenge to Cannonball at a Hellfire Club gala. He also participated in the Hellions' capture of Viper and Silver Samurai, and the Hellions' unsuccessful attempt to capture Bird-Brain. After that, Jetstream joined in the Hellions' mock attack on new recruit Magma during a training session.

On the team's final mission, Jetstream went along with the Hellions in order to retrieve former-member Firestar. They found her in the ranks of the New Warriors and their leaders, Tai and the White Queen, decide to have a series of fights to see who would get her, whichever team defeated more of the other won. This deal was unknown to either team as they were already fighting. Jetstream was defeated by Nova who ended up punching him through a wall. The Hellions, as a team, lost and went home, not knowing that their young lives would soon be over.

Soon after, Emma threw another party which the Hellions as well as the X-Men Gold team attended. It was there that Trevor Fitzroy—a member of the villainous group known as the Upstarts—crashed the party with the goal of killing Emma in order to gain points within the group. The Hellions were mere formalities: Jetstream was killed in the opening salvo of the crossfire by Fitzroy in order to fuel his teleportation portal.

Necrosha
Jetstream is shown on the cover of New Mutants vol. 3 #7 along with the other deceased Hellions.

Powers and abilities
Jetstream was a mutant who could generate thermo-chemical energy, accompanied by plasma (a super-heated state of matter), and release it through his skin. Jetstream could only release this energy downward beneath him, and the result was that it propelled him through the air like a human rocket. He could also release energy from all of his limbs, thus delivering at close to the speed of sound. Jetstream's body was immune to damage from the intense heat released by these energy discharges and by the plasma. He could not fly beyond a certain undefined distance without temporarily exhausting his energy powers.

However, Jetstream's body was unable to withstand the tremendous energies he generated—one day his flesh even caught fire as he flew. To save him and enable him to use his power, the Hellfire Club provided Jetstream with a Frost Industries bionic system. Among these systems was a bionic backpack that could fold away into his body which contained computerized scanning devices and aerial navigation, and rockets in his thighs to help better contain, focus, and control his power.

Jetstream was a fair hand-to-hand combatant, having been trained at the Massachusetts Academy. He was also skilled in utilizing computers.

References

External links
Uncannyxmen.net character bio on Jetstream
Uncannyxmen.net feature on the Hellions

Comics characters introduced in 1984
Marvel Comics mutants
Marvel Comics supervillains